Luki may refer to:

 Lüki (Iteu), community of Abram in Romania
 Pierre Louki, a French actor and singer/songwriter.
 Velikiye Luki, a city in the southern part of Pskov Oblast, Russia. 
 FC Luki-SKIF Velikiye Luki, a Russian football team from Velikiye Luki
 Luki (crater), an impact crater on Mars

See also
 Luke (disambiguation)
 Lukis (disambiguation)
 Lucas (disambiguation)